Meeksi Parish was a rural municipality in Tartu County, Estonia. In 2017, Meeksi Parish, Räpina Parish and Veriora Parish were merged and a new municipality Räpina Parish was formed within Põlva County.

Settlements
Small borough
Mehikoorma

Villages
Aravu - Haavametsa - Järvselja - Jõepera - Meeksi - Meerapalu - Parapalu - Rõka - Sikakurmu

Gallery

See also
Järvselja Nature Reserve
Mehikoorma Lighthouse
Mehikoorma Umbjärv

References

External links

 

Former municipalities of Estonia
Tartu County